Tytthoscincus ishaki, the Tioman Island forest skink, is a species of skink. It is endemic to Tioman Island in Malaysia.

References

ishaki
Endemic fauna of Malaysia
Reptiles of Malaysia
Reptiles described in 2006
Taxa named by Larry Lee Grismer